This is a list of former members of Mormon fundamentalism churches.

Former members

Fundamentalist Church of Jesus Christ of Latter-Day Saints (FLDS)

Brent W. Jeffs
 Carolyn Jessop
 Flora Jessop
 Ruby Jessop
 Rebecca Musser
 Elissa Wall

Apostolic United Brethren (AUB)
Lance Allred
Dorothy Allred Solomon

Church of the Firstborn of the Fulness of Times

Susan Ray Schmidt
 Irene Spencer

Others
These former members belonged to different polygamist groups; FLDS, AUB, Church of the Firstborn of the Fulness of Times and other LDS polygamist groups.
Cathleen Hansen
Doris Hanson
Janis Hutchinson
Howard Mackert
Mary Mackert
David McGaughey
Paul Owen
Sandra Tanner

References

List
Mormon fundamentalists, former